Mark Haluptzok (born December 19, 1951, in Bemidji, Minnesota, United States) is an American curler.

He inducted into the United States Curling Association Hall of Fame in 2007.

Teams

Men's

Mixed

Private life
Mark Haluptzok works as commercial flooring contractor; he is owner of Haluptzok Flooring and T. Juan's Restaurant.

He started curling in 1963 when he was 12 years old. His father, mother and older brother Dan are curlers too, Dan played together with Mark on three Worlds (1979, 1993, 1994).

References

External links
 

Living people
1951 births
People from Bemidji, Minnesota
Sportspeople from Minnesota
American male curlers
American curling champions